The following is a list of Native reserves in Quebec, Canada. It includes only the reserves that are officially designated as Indian reserve and fall under the jurisdiction of the Canadian government's Department of Indian and Northern Affairs. Therefore, other Aboriginal local municipal units of Quebec are not listed here and can be found in the See also section.

See also
Indigenous peoples in Quebec
List of Indian settlements in Quebec
List of northern villages and Inuit reserved lands in Quebec
List of Cree and Naskapi territories in Quebec
Administrative divisions of Quebec

References

 
Indian reserves
Indian, Quebec